Doreen Lindsay (1934) is a Canadian artist known for her photography.

Early life and education
Lindsay received a certificate in Fine Arts, Instituto Allende, Mexico in 1957. from Sir George Williams University, Montreal, she earned a Bachelor of Fine Arts degree in 1965, followed by a master's degree in art education in 1969. 

Lindsay married the photographer Gabor Szilasi.

Collections
Her work is included in the collections of the Musée national des beaux-arts du Québec and the National Gallery of Canada

References

Living people
1934 births
20th-century Canadian women artists
21st-century Canadian women artists